The R563 is a Regional Route in the Mogale City Local Municipality of South Africa. It connects Hekpoort with Krugersdorp.

Route
Its north-western terminus is the R560 at Hekpoort, Gauteng. It runs south-east, past Sterkfontein Caves, before crossing the N14 National Route at a staggered junction and entering Krugersdorp to end at an intersection with the M36 Metropolitan Route (Commissioner Street).

References

Regional Routes in Gauteng